The 4e Régiment d'Hélicoptères des Forces Spéciales or 4e RHFS is a special operations unit of the French Army Light Aviation. It is part of the French Army Special Forces Command, therefore of the Special Operations Command. It is based in Pau. 

Created in 1997, the 4e RHFS' mission is to transport and provide air support to the other special forces units anywhere in the world.

Organization 
The regiment is divided into Special Forces Flights (Escadrilles des Operations Speciales):
 EOS 1 – Puma and Cougar
 EOS 2 – Gazelle
 EOS 3 – Caracals
 EOS 4/GIH – Pumas
 EOS 6 – Tigre
 EOS 7 – Support Flight
 EOS 8 – Helicopter Maintenance Flight

The regiment employs the following helicopters in 2016:  
 10 Eurcopter AS532 UL/AL Cougar
 12 Aérospatiale Gazelle
 7 Eurocopter AS332 Super Puma and Aérospatiale SA 330 Puma
 6 Eurocopter Tigre HAD
 ? Eurocopter EC725 Caracal

See also 
 Italian 3rd Special Operations Helicopter Regiment
 U.S. 160th Special Operations Aviation Regiment - Night Stalkers
 Australian 171st Special Operations Aviation Squadron
 British Joint Special Forces Aviation Wing
 Canadian 427 Special Operations Aviation Squadron

References

External links 
 official French Army page

Special forces of France
1997 establishments in France
Military units and formations established in 1997
Helicopter units and formations
Regiments of French Army Light Aviation